The Ruhr (also Ruhrpott ), also referred to as the Ruhr area, sometimes Ruhr district, Ruhr region, or Ruhr valley, is a polycentric urban area in North Rhine-Westphalia, Germany. With a population density of 2,800/km2 and a population of over 5 million (2017), it is the largest urban area in Germany. It consists of several large cities bordered by the rivers Ruhr to the south, Rhine to the west, and Lippe to the north. In the southwest it borders the Bergisches Land. It is considered part of the larger Rhine-Ruhr metropolitan region of more than 10 million people, which is the third largest in Europe, behind only London and Paris.

The Ruhr cities are, from west to east: Duisburg, Oberhausen, Bottrop, Mülheim an der Ruhr, Essen, Gelsenkirchen, Bochum, Herne, Hagen, Dortmund, Lünen, Bergkamen, Hamm, Castrop-Rauxel and the districts of Wesel, Recklinghausen, Unna and Ennepe-Ruhr-Kreis. The most populous cities are Dortmund (with a population of approximately 588,000), Essen (about 583,000) and Duisburg (about 497,000).

In the Middle Ages, the Hellweg was an important trade route from the region of the Lower Rhine to the mountains of the Teutoburg Forest. The most important towns of the region from Duisburg to the imperial city of Dortmund were concentrated along the Hellweg from the Rhineland to Westphalia. Since the 19th century, these cities have grown together into a large complex with a vast industrial landscape, inhabited by some 7.3 million people (including Düsseldorf and Wuppertal, large cities that are nearby but officially not part of the Ruhr area).

The Ruhr area has no administrative centre; each city in the area has its own administration, although there exists the supracommunal "Regionalverband Ruhr" institution in Essen. For 2010, the Ruhr region was one of the European Capitals of Culture.

Etymology 

The 1911 edition of Encyclopædia Britannica has only one definition of "Ruhr": "a river of Germany, an important right-bank tributary of the lower Rhine". The use of the term "Ruhr" for the industrial region started in Britain only after World War I, when French and Belgian troops had occupied the Ruhr district and seized its prime industrial assets in lieu of unpaid reparations in 1923. In 1920, the International Labour Office published a report entitled Coal Production in the Ruhr District. In 1923, the Canadian Commercial Intelligence Journal, Volume 28, Issue 1013, includes the article, "Exports from the Ruhr district of Germany". In 1924 the English and American press was still talking of the "French occupation of the Ruhr Valley" or "Ruhr District". A 62-page publication seems to be responsible for the use of "Ruhr" as a short form of the then more common "Ruhr District" or "Ruhr Valley": Ben Tillett, A. Creech-Jones and Samuel Warren's The Ruhr: The Report of a Deputation from the Transport and General Workers Union (London 1923). Yet "The report of a deputation from the Transport and General Workers' Union which spent a fortnight examining the problems in the Ruhr Valley", published in The Economic Review, Volume 8, 1923, is still using the traditional term. In the same year, "Objections by the United States to discriminatory regulations on exports from the occupied region of the Ruhr" was published in Papers Relating to the Foreign Relations of the United States.

The 1926 Encyclopædia Britannica, in addition to its article on the river Ruhr, has a further article on "RUHR, the name given to a district of Westphalia, Germany". Thus the name "Ruhr" was given to the region (as a short form of "Ruhr District" or "Ruhr Valley") only a few years before the publication of this edition of the Encyclopædia Britannica. Even after World War II, the term "Ruhr" may not have been in general use for the region: it was defined in Documents on American Foreign Relations (1948): "For the purposes of the present Agreement: (i) the expression 'Ruhr' means the areas, as presently constituted, in Land North Rhine–Westphalia, listed in the Annex to this Agreement." However, Lawrence K. Cecil and Philip Hauge Abelson still write in 1967: "In the first place, the average person uses the term 'Ruhr' indiscriminately as the Ruhr River or the Ruhr district, two entirely different things. The Ruhr River is only one of half a dozen rivers in the Ruhr district, in addition to the Rhine. The Rhine itself runs through the heart of the Ruhr district." According to Merriam Webster's Geographical Dictionary, a standard reference on place names around the world, the name "Ruhr" refers to the river. The name preferred for the region in this dictionary is "Ruhrgebiet", followed by "Ruhr Valley".

Geography

The urban landscape of the Ruhr extends from the Lower Rhine Basin east to the Westphalian Plain and south to the hills of the Rhenish Massif. Through the centre of the Ruhr runs a segment of the loess belt that extends across Germany from west to east. Historically, this loess belt has underlain some of Germany's richest agricultural regions.

Geologically, the region is defined by coal-bearing layers from the upper Carboniferous period. The coal seams reach the surface in a strip along the river Ruhr and dip downward from the river to the north. Beneath the Lippe, the coal seams lie at a depth of 600 to 800 metres (2,000 to 2,600 feet). The thickness of the coal layers ranges from one to three metres (three to ten feet). This geological feature played a decisive role in the development of coal mining in the Ruhr.

According to the Regionalverband Ruhr (RVR, Ruhr Regional Association), 37.6% of the region's area is built up. A total of 40.7% of the region's land remains in agricultural use. Forests account for 17.6%, and bodies of water and other types of land use occupy the rest. The inclusion of four mainly rural districts in the otherwise mainly industrial Ruhr helps to explain the large proportion of agricultural and forested land. In addition, the city boroughs of the Ruhr region have outlying districts with a rural character.

Seen on a map, the Ruhr could be considered a single city, since there are no visible breaks between the individual city boroughs. Thus the Ruhr is described as a polycentric urban area, which shares a similar history of urban and economic development.

Because of its history, the Ruhr is structured differently from monocentric urban regions such as Berlin, which developed through the rapid absorption of smaller towns and villages by the most significant city among them. Instead in the Ruhr, the individual city boroughs and urban districts of the Ruhr grew in a rapid and parallel fashion independently of one another during the Industrial Revolution. The population density of the central Ruhr is about 2,100 inhabitants per square kilometre (about 5,400 per square mile)—not too high compared to other German cities.

Between the constituent urban areas are relatively open suburbs and even some open land with agricultural fields. In many places however, the borders between cities in the central Ruhr are unrecognizable, blending into one urban landscape due to continuous development across them.

The replanting of brownfield land has created new parks and recreation areas in recent decades. The Emscher Landschaftspark (Emscher Landscape Park) lies along the river Emscher, formerly virtually an open sewer, parts of which have undergone natural restoration. This park connects strips of parkland running from north to south, which were developed through regional planning in the 1920s, to form a green belt between the Ruhr cities from east to west.

History

During the Middle Ages, much of the region that was later called the Ruhrgebiet was situated in the County of Mark, the Duchies of Cleves and Berg and the territories of the bishop of Münster and the archbishop of Cologne. The region included some villages and castles, and was mainly agrarian: its loess soil made it one of the richer parts of western Germany. The free imperial city of Dortmund was the trading and cultural centre, lying on the Hellweg, an important east–west trading route, that also brought prosperity to the town of Duisburg. Both towns were members of the Hanseatic League.

Industrial revolution
The development of the region into an urbanized industrial area started in the late 18th century with the early industrialisation in the nearby Wupper Valley in the Bergisches Land. By around 1820, hundreds of water-powered mills were producing textiles, lumber, shingles and iron in automated processes here. And in even more workshops in the hills, highly skilled workers manufactured knives, tools, weapons and harnesses, using water, coal and charcoal.

As the machines became bigger and moved from water power to steam power, locally mined coal and charcoal became expensive and there was not enough of it. The Bergische industry ordered more and more coal from the new coal mining area along the Ruhr. Impressive and expensive railways were constructed through the hilly Wupper region, to bring coal, and later steel, in from the Ruhr, and for outward transport of finished products.

By 1850, there were almost 300 coal mines in operation in the Ruhr area, in and around the central cities of Duisburg, Essen, Bochum and Dortmund. The coal was exported or processed in coking ovens into coke, used in blast furnaces, producing iron and steel. In this period the name Ruhrgebiet became common. Before the coal deposits along the Ruhr were exhausted, the mining industry moved northward to the Emscher and finally to the Lippe, drilling ever deeper mines as it went. Locks built at Mülheim on the Ruhr led to the expansion of Mülheim as a port. With the construction of the Cologne-Minden railway in the late 19th century, several iron works were built within the borders of the present-day city of Oberhausen.

Moreover, the urbanization also boosted the expansion of railroad connections. At the beginning of the 1880s, agricultural regions did not benefit from the newly built transport facilities as much as non-agricultural regions did. This in its turn increased inequality, and made anthropometric measurements, e.g. height, more dependent on wages. In the long run, however, effects of the railroad proximity diminished.

Consequently, the population climbed rapidly. Towns with only 2,000 to 5,000 people in the early 19th century grew in the following 100 years to over 100,000. Skilled mineworkers were recruited from other regions to the Ruhr's mines and steel mills and unskilled people started to move in. From 1860 onwards there was large-scale migration from Silesia, Pomerania, East Prussia and Posen to the Ruhr. Many of them were Polish speakers and they were treated as second class citizens. In 1899 this led to a revolt in Herne of young Polish workers, who later established a Workers' Union. Skilled workers in the mines were often housed in "miners' colonies", built by the mining firms. By 1870, over 3 million people lived in the Ruhrgebiet and the new coal-mining district had become the largest industrial region of Europe.

During World War I the Ruhrgebiet functioned as Germany's central weapon factory. At a big Essen company, F. Krupp A.G., the number of employees rose from 40,000 to 120,000 or more, in four years. They were partly women, partly forced labourers.

Weimar Republic
The Spartacist Uprising in 1919, which originated in Berlin, became popular among the working class in the Ruhr, and the region quickly adopted Marxism. The uprising was defeated by the Freikorps in less than a week, and the Weimar Republic established control over the Ruhr. The Kapp Putsch occurred in March 1919, when autocrats attempted to overthrow the Weimar government. The Weimar government defeated the putsch, albeit it advocated a general strike, which large parts of the working class participated in. The general strike effectively ended the Kapp government, but in the Ruhr, striking workers successfully managed to take government buildings in March 1920 shocking the rest of Germany. An armed revolt was then instigated, and the Red Guard installed a branch in the Ruhr. This became known as the Ruhr Uprising. The workers councils that led the uprising declared the Ruhr to be a socialist republic, but the Freikorps and Reichswehr put down the rebellion in April 1919, and re-established the Weimar Republic's control of the Ruhr.

In March 1921, French and Belgian troops occupied Duisburg, which under the Treaty of Versailles formed part of the demilitarized Rhineland. In January 1923 the whole Ruhrgebiet was occupied as a reprisal after Germany failed to fulfill World War I reparation payments as agreed in the Versailles Treaty. The German government responded with "passive resistance", letting workers and civil servants refuse orders and instructions by the occupation forces. Production and transport came to a standstill and the financial consequences contributed to German hyperinflation and ruined public finances in Germany and France, as well as several other countries. Passive resistance was called off in late 1923, allowing Germany to implement a currency reform and to negotiate the Dawes Plan, which led to the withdrawal of the French and Belgian troops from the Ruhr in 1925. However, the occupation of the Ruhr caused several direct and indirect consequences on the German economy and government. Due to the lack of production caused by foreign occupation, the German economy lacked the domestic abilities to pay war reparations without intentionally causing inflation. Moreover, the government became increasingly unpopular due to its "passive resistance" to German production. The halt in domestic production made war reparations impossible to pay.

Nazi period
On 7 March 1936, Adolf Hitler took a massive gamble by sending 30,000 troops into the Rhineland. As Hitler and other Nazis admitted, the French army alone could have destroyed the Wehrmacht. The French passed the problem to the British, who found that the Germans had the right to "enter their own backyard", and no action was taken. In the League of Nations, the Soviet delegate Maxim Litvinov was the only one who proposed economic sanctions against Germany. All restraint on German rearmament was now removed. France's eastern allies (the Soviet Union, Poland, Czechoslovakia, Romania and Yugoslavia) concluded that since the French refused to defend their own border, they certainly would not stand up for their allies in the East. Hitler could now continue eroding the alliance system that France had built since 1919. On 16 October 1936, Belgium repudiated the 1921 alliance with France and declared its absolute neutrality. In October 1937, Belgium signed a non-aggression pact with Germany.

During World War II, the bombing of the Ruhr in 1940–1944 caused a loss of 30% of plant and equipment (compared to 15–20% for German industry as a whole). A second battle of the Ruhr (6/7 October 1944 – end of 1944) began with an attack on Dortmund. The devastating bombing raids of Dortmund on 12 March 1945 with 1,108 aircraft – 748 Lancasters, 292 Halifaxes, 68 Mosquitos – was a record to a single target in the whole of World War II. More than 4,800 tons of bombs were dropped through the city centre and the south of the city.

In addition to the strategic bombing of the Ruhr, in April 1945, the Allies trapped several hundred thousand Wehrmacht troops in the Ruhr Pocket.

Postwar period
After the war, the region fell within the British occupation zone, and Level of Industry plans for Germany abolished all German munitions factories and civilian industries that could support them and severely restricted civilian industries of military potential. The Ruhr Authority, an international body to regulate the Ruhr's coal and steel industries, was created as a condition for the establishment of the Federal Republic of Germany.

During the Cold War, the Western allies anticipated that any Red Army thrust into Western Europe would begin in the Fulda Gap and have the Ruhr as a primary target. Increased German control of the area was limited by the pooling of German coal and steel into the multinational European Coal and Steel Community in 1951. The nearby Saar region, containing much of Germany's remaining coal deposits, was handed over to economic administration by France as a protectorate in 1947 and did not politically return to Germany until January 1957, with economic reintegration occurring two years later. Parallel to the question of political control of the Ruhr, the Allies tried to decrease German industrial potential by limitations on production and dismantling of factories and steel plants, predominantly in the Ruhr. By 1950, after the virtual completion of the by-then much watered-down "level of industry" plans, equipment had been removed from 706 manufacturing plants in the west, and steel production capacity had been reduced by 6.7 million tons. Dismantling finally ended in 1951. In all, less than 5% of the industrial base was dismantled.

The Ruhr was at the centre of the German economic miracle Wirtschaftswunder of the 1950s and 1960s, as very rapid economic growth (9% a year) created a heavy demand for coal and steel.

After 1973, Germany was hard hit by a worldwide economic crisis, soaring oil prices, and increasing unemployment, which jumped from 300,000 in 1973 to 1.1 million in 1975. The Ruhr region was hardest hit, as the easy-to-reach coal mines became exhausted, and German coal was no longer competitive. Likewise the Ruhr steel industry went into sharp decline, as its prices were undercut by lower-cost suppliers such as Japan. The welfare system provided a safety net for the large number of unemployed workers, and many factories reduced their labor force and began to concentrate on high-profit specialty items.

As demand for coal decreased after 1958, the area went through phases of structural crisis (see steel crisis) and industrial diversification, first developing traditional heavy industry, then moving into service industries and high technology. The air and water pollution of the area are largely a thing of the past although some issues take a long time to solve. In 2005 Essen was the official candidate for nomination as European Capital of Culture for 2010.

Climate

The Ruhr has an oceanic climate in spite of its inland position, with winds from the Atlantic travelling over the lowlands to moderate temperature extremes, in spite of its relatively northerly latitude that sees significant variety in daylight hours. A consequence of the marine influence is a cloudy and wet climate with low sunshine hours. Summers normally average in the low 20s, with winters being somewhat above the freezing point.

From the onset of the 21st century, the effects of global warming have become more profound. The area has been affected by severe droughts (like 2018), heat waves with temperatures above  (2019) and severe weather events like the bow echo that hit the cities on June 9, 2014, and caused tens of thousands of trees to fall which was publicly dubbed the "Pfingststurm" (German for "Whitsun storm"). Winters have become more mild which poses a risk for crops such as apples whose blooms are vulnerable to late freezes if bud break happens too early.

Demographics

The ten largest cities of the Ruhr:

The local dialect of German is commonly called Ruhrdeutsch or Ruhrpottdeutsch, although there is really no uniform dialect that justifies designation as a  single dialect. It is rather a working-class sociolect with influences from the various dialects found in the area and changing even with the professions of the workers. A major common influence stems from the coal mining tradition of the area. For example, quite a few locals prefer to call the Ruhr either "Pott", which is a derivate of "Pütt" (pitmen's term for mine; cp. the English "pit"), or "Revier".

During the nineteenth century, the Ruhr attracted up to 500,000 ethnic Poles, Masurians and Silesians from East Prussia and Silesia in a migration known as Ostflucht (flight from the east). By 1925, the Ruhrgebiet had around 3,800,000 inhabitants. Most of the new inhabitants came from Eastern Europe, but immigrants also came from France, Ireland, and the United Kingdom. It has been claimed that immigrants came to the Ruhr from over 140 countries. Almost all their descendants today speak German as a first language, and for various reasons, they do not identify with their Polish roots and traditions, often their Polish family names only remain as a sign of their past.

Culture

The Industrial Heritage Trail links tourist attractions related to the European Route of Industrial Heritage in the Ruhr area.

Ruhr is known for its numerous cultural institutions, many of which enjoy international reputation. Ruhr has three major opera houses and more than 10 theaters and stages.

 Schauspielhaus Bochum 
 Opernhaus Dortmund 
 Theater Dortmund 
 Theater Oberhausen
 German Opera on the Rhine at Duisburg
 Theater Essen
 Grillo-Theater at Essen

There are special classical music halls like the Bochumer Symphoniker, the Duisburg Mercatorhalle, the Saalbau Essen or the Dortmunder Philharmoniker. Each year in spring time, there is the Klavier-Festival Ruhr in the Ruhr area with 50 to 80 events of classical and jazz music.

With more than 50 museums, Ruhr has one of the largest variety of museums in Europe.

 German Mining Museum at Bochum
 German Football Museum at Dortmund
 Museum of Art and Cultural History at Dortmund
 Ostwall Museum at Dortmund
 Natural history museum at Dortmund
 Museum Folkwang at Essen
 Essen Cathedral Treasury at Essen
 Museum Küppersmühle at Duisburg
 Lehmbruck-Museum at Duisburg
 Hagen Open-air Museum at Hagen
Industrial Museum
 Zollern II/IV Colliery at Dortmund
 German Inland Waterways Museum at Duisburg
 Landschaftspark Duisburg-Nord  at Duisburg
 Zollverein Coal Mine Industrial Complex at Essen
 Gasometer Oberhausen at Oberhausen
 Ewald Colliery at Herten, dedicated to green energy and a commercial and cultural park

The city of Essen (representing the Ruhr) was selected as European Capital of Culture for 2010 by the Council of the European Union.

In association football, the Revierderby is the rivalry between Borussia Dortmund and FC Schalke 04, and to a lesser extent between either club and/or VfL Bochum, MSV Duisburg or Rot-Weiss Essen (kleines Revierderby).

Education 

With 22 universities and colleges and more than 250,000 students, the Ruhr region has the highest density of further education establishments anywhere in Germany. These include five universities alone in the cities of Bochum, Duisburg, Dortmund, Essen and Witten. In addition, Folkwang University of the Arts is an internationally acclaimed art college with its base in the Ruhr region. Furthermore, the universities are not the only places in the Ruhr region where academic qualifications can be obtained. There are 17 different universities of applied sciences which offer students to have the opportunity to undertake practice-relevant and qualified studies in various subjects, such as economics, logistics, administration or management.

Universities 
The Ruhr area has 5 major universities in 6 cities with about 120,000 students.
 Ruhr University Bochum
 University of Duisburg-Essen
 Technical University of Dortmund
 Folkwang University of the Arts
 Witten/Herdecke University

UA Ruhr 
The three largest universities (Ruhr University Bochum, TU Dortmund University, and the University of Duisburg-Essen) opened an alliance called "UA Ruhr". Students enrolled at one of the UA Ruhr universities can attend lectures and seminars at all three institutions without having to pay a visiting student fee. Consequently, they have many options to specialize in and to explore their chosen disciplines in depth. The UA Ruhr has three liaison offices for interested students in New York City, Moscow and São Paulo.

Universities of Applied Sciences and Arts

Bochum 
 Bochum University of Applied Sciences (Hochschule Bochum, formerly Fachhochschule Bochum)
 Georg Agricola University of Applied Sciences (TH Georg Agricola)
 Protestant University of Applied Sciences, Rheinland-Westphalia-Lippe (Evangelische FH Rheinland-Westfalen-Lippe)
 Schauspielschule Bochum (Bochum drama school)
 College of the Federal Social Security, Department of Social Insurance for Miners, Railway Employees and Seafarers (Fachhochschule des Bundes der Sozialversicherung, Abteilung Knappschaft-Bahn-See)
 University of Health Sciences (Hochschule für Gesundheit)

Bottrop 
 Hochschule Ruhr West

Dortmund 

 Fachhochschule Dortmund
 FOM Hochschule für Oekonomie & Management, Standort Dortmund (Academy for management)
 Fachhochschule für öffentliche Verwaltung Nordrhein-Westfalen (Academy for public administration)
 International School of Management (Private academy focussing on management and economics)
 IT-Center Dortmund (Private college)

Duisburg 
 FOM Hochschule für Oekonomie und Management (Academy for management)
 Fachhochschule für öffentliche Verwaltung (Academy for public administration)

Essen 

 FOM Hochschule für Oekonomie und Management
 Hochschule für bildende Künste
 Orchesterzentrum NRW

Gelsenkirchen 
 Westfälische Hochschule 
 Fachhochschule für öffentliche Verwaltung NRW (Academy for public administration)

Hagen 
 University of Hagen
 FOM Hochschule für Oekonomie und Management
 Fachhochschule für öffentliche Verwaltung (Academy for public administration)
 South Westphalia University of Applied Sciences

Hamm 
 SRH Hochschule für Logistik und Wirtschaft 
 Hochschule Hamm-Lippstadt

Kamp-Lintfort 
 Rhine-Waal University of Applied Sciences

Mülheim an der Ruhr 
 Hochschule Ruhr West 
 Fachhochschule für öffentliche Verwaltung NRW (Academy for public administration)

Recklinghausen 
 Westfälische Hochschule

Unna 
 Hochschule Campus Unna

Transport

Public transport
With the exception of public transport companies serving Hamm and Kreis Unna, all such companies in the Ruhr region are run under the umbrella of the Verkehrsverbund Rhein-Ruhr, which provides a uniform ticket system valid for the entire area. The Ruhr region is well-integrated into the national rail system, the Deutsche Bahn, for both passenger and goods services, each city in the region has at least one or more train stations. The bigger central stations have hourly direct connections to the bigger European cities as Amsterdam, Brussels, Paris, Vienna or Zürich.

The Ruhr area also contains the longest tram system in the world, with tram and Stadtbahn services from Witten to Krefeld as well as the Rhine-Ruhr S-Bahn network.
Originally the system was even bigger, it was possible to travel from Unna to Bad Honnef without using railway or bus services.

Road transport
The Ruhr has one of the densest motorway networks in all of Europe, with dozens of Autobahns and similar Schnellstraßen (expressways) crossing the region. The Autobahn network is built in a grid network, with four east–west (A2, A40, A42, A44) and seven north–south (A1, A3, A43, A45, A52, A57, A59) routes. The A1, A2 and A3 are mostly used by through traffic, while the other autobahns have a more regional function.

Both the A44 and the A52 have several missing links, in various stages of planning. Some missing sections are currently in construction or planned to be constructed in the near future.

Additional expressways serve as bypasses and local routes, especially around Dortmund and Bochum. Due to the density of the autobahns and expressways, Bundesstraßen are less important for intercity traffic. The first Autobahns in the Ruhr opened during the mid-1930s. Due to the density of the network, and the number of alternative routes, traffic volumes are generally lower than other major metropolitan areas in Europe. Traffic congestion is an everyday occurrence, but far less so than in the Randstad in the Netherlands, another polycentric urban area. Most important Autobahns have six lanes, but there are no eight-lane Autobahns in the Ruhr.

Air transport
Düsseldorf Airport is the intercontinental airport for North Rhine-Westphalia and is within 20 km of most of the Western Ruhr area. 
It is served by the Düsseldorf Flughafen and Düsseldorf Flughafen Terminal railway stations, with its several parking lots, terminals and stations being connected by the Skytrain.

Dortmund Airport in the Eastern Ruhr is a mid-sized airport, offering scheduled flights to domestic and European destinations and its approximately 1.9 million passengers in 2013. Dortmund Airport is served by an express bus to Dortmund main station, a shuttle bus to the nearby railway station Holzwickede/Dortmund Flughafen, a bus connecting to Stadtbahn line U47, as well as a bus to the city of Unna.

See also

 Metropolitan regions in Germany
 Occupation of the Ruhr (1923–1924)
 Rhine-Ruhr Metropolitan Region
 Ruhr pocket
 Ruhrpolen
 Silesian metropolitan area
 Upper Silesian Coal Basin

Explanatory notes

Citations

General and cited sources

Further reading
 Kift, Roy, Tour the Ruhr: The English language guide (3rd ed., 2008) Klartext Verlag, Essen
 Berndt, Christian. Corporate Germany between Globalization and Regional Place Dependence: Business Restructuring in the Ruhr Area (2001)
 Crew, David.  Town in the Ruhr: A Social History of Bochum, 1860–1914 (1979)
 Fischer, Conan. The Ruhr Crisis, 1923–1924 (2003)
 Gillingham, John. "Ruhr Coal Miners and Hitler's War", Journal of Social History Vol. 15, No. 4 (Summer, 1982), pp. 637–653 in JSTOR* Chauncy D. Harris, "The Ruhr Coal-mining District", Geographical Review, 36 (1946), 194–221.
 Gillingham, John. Industry and Politics in the Third Reich: Ruhr Coal, Hitler, and Europe (1985)
 Pounds, Norman J. G. "The Ruhr Area: A Problem in Definition," Geography 36#3 (1951), pp. 165–178. online
 Pounds, Norman J. G. The Ruhr: A Study in Historical and Economic Geography (1952) online
 Pierenkemper, Toni. "Entrepreneurs in Heavy Industry: Upper Silesia and the Westphalian Ruhr Region, 1852 to 1913", Business History Review Vol. 53, No. 1 (Spring, 1979), pp. 65–78 in JSTOR
 Royal Jae Schmidt. Versailles and the Ruhr: Seedbed of World War II (1968)
 Spencer, Elaine Glovka. "Employer Response to Unionism: Ruhr Coal Industrialists before 1914," Journal of Modern History Vol. 48, No. 3 (Sep., 1976), pp. 397–412 in JSTOR
 Spencer, Elaine Glovka. Management and Labor in Imperial Germany: Ruhr Industrialists as Employers, 1896–1914. Rutgers University Press. (1984) online
 Todd, Edmund N. "Industry, State, and Electrical Technology in the Ruhr Circa 1900", Osiris 2nd Series, Vol. 5, (1989), pp. 242–259 in JSTOR

External links

 Ruhr Tourism
 Post-Surrender Program for Germany (September 1944)
 Ruhr Delegation of the United States of America, Council of Foreign Ministers American Embassy Moscow, March 24, 1947 
 Draft, The President's Economic Mission to Germany and Austria, Report 3, March, 1947; OF 950B: Economic Mission as to Food…; Truman Papers. 
 France, Germany and the Struggle for the War-making Natural Resources of the Rhineland Describes the contest for the Ruhr and Saar over the centuries.
 Ruhrgebietsbilder: Photos about the Ruhr

 
Coal mining regions in Germany
Cultural landscapes of North Rhine-Westphalia
Metropolitan areas of Germany
Regions of North Rhine-Westphalia